Kappa Leporis, Latinized from κ Leporis, is a binary star system in the southern constellation of Lepus. The pair have apparent visual magnitudes of 4.43 and 7.00, with the former being bright enough to be seen with the naked eye. As of 2000, they had an angular separation of 2.179 arc seconds along a position angle of 357.3°. Based upon an annual parallax shift of 4.48 mas as measured from Earth, the system is located roughly 730 light years from the Sun. The system is travelling away from the Sun with a radial velocity of +20.8 km/s.

The brighter, blue-white hued member of the system, component A, is a B-type main-sequence star with a stellar classification of B9 V. It has nearly five times the mass of the Sun and around 2.6 times the Sun's radius. The star is radiating 1,346 times the Sun's luminosity from its photosphere at an effective temperature of 11,588 K. It displays an infrared excess at a wavelength of 12μm, making it a candidate host for a circumstellar debris disk.

References

B-type main-sequence stars
Binary stars
Circumstellar disks
Lepus (constellation)
Leporis, Kappa
Durchmusterung objects
Leporis, 04
033949
024327
1705